Neocteniza is a genus of armored trapdoor spiders that was first described by Reginald Innes Pocock in 1895. Originally placed with the Actinopodidae, it was moved to the Idiopidae in 1985.

Species
 it contains eighteen species found in Central and South America:
Neocteniza agustinea Miranda & Arizala, 2013 – Panama
Neocteniza australis Goloboff, 1987 – Brazil, Argentina
Neocteniza chancani Goloboff & Platnick, 1992 – Argentina
Neocteniza coylei Goloboff & Platnick, 1992 – Peru
Neocteniza fantastica Platnick & Shadab, 1976 – Colombia
Neocteniza malkini Platnick & Shadab, 1981 – Ecuador
Neocteniza mexicana F. O. Pickard-Cambridge, 1897 – Guatemala
Neocteniza minima Goloboff, 1987 – Bolivia, Argentina
Neocteniza myriamae Bertani, Fukushima & Nagahama, 2006 – Brazil
Neocteniza occulta Platnick & Shadab, 1981 – Panama
Neocteniza osa Platnick & Shadab, 1976 – Costa Rica
Neocteniza paucispina Platnick & Shadab, 1976 – Guatemala
Neocteniza platnicki Goloboff, 1987 – Paraguay
Neocteniza pococki Platnick & Shadab, 1976 – Venezuela
Neocteniza sclateri Pocock, 1895 (type) – Guyana
Neocteniza spinosa Goloboff, 1987 – Argentina
Neocteniza subirana Platnick & Shadab, 1976 – Honduras
Neocteniza toba Goloboff, 1987 – Paraguay, Argentina

See also
 List of Idiopidae species

References

Idiopidae
Mygalomorphae genera
Spiders of Central America
Spiders of South America
Taxa named by R. I. Pocock